Ch'unchu is a folk dance in Peru. It is performed on festivals of the Cusco Region like Mamacha Carmen in Paucartambo and Quyllur Rit'i. Varieties include q'ara ch'unchu, qhapaq ch'unchu and  wayri ch'unchu. Its name comes from a derogatory Quechua word (also used in Aymara) for native inhabitants of the Amazon Rainforest.

See also 
 Ch'unchu people
 Qhapaq negro
 Qhapaq Qulla
 Saqra

References 

Peruvian dances
Native American dances
Cusco Region